Donald John Chuy (July 20, 1941 – January 6, 2014) was a professional American football player who played guard for seven seasons for the Los Angeles Rams and the Philadelphia Eagles.

Born in Newark, New Jersey, Chuy was raised in nearby Nutley, where he attended Nutley High School.

While playing for the Rams in 1965, he and several of his teammates played cameo roles as football players in the Perry Mason episode, "The Case of the 12th Wildcat."

He died at his Myrtle Beach, South Carolina home in January 2014. He was 72.

References

1941 births
2014 deaths
Nutley High School alumni
People from Nutley, New Jersey
Players of American football from Newark, New Jersey
American football offensive guards
Clemson Tigers football players
Los Angeles Rams players
Philadelphia Eagles players